Sport Science is an ongoing television series that explores the science and engineering underlying athletic endeavors.  Originally filmed as  a 12-part series that was broadcast on FSN from September 9, 2007, to April 20, 2008 (Series 1), the second series (2009) also appeared on FSN.  Series 3 (2010) was picked up by ESPN. ESPN, who has changed the name of the series to SportScience, has yet to air new episodes. Instead, the network has chosen to air various SportScience vignettes during programs such as SportsCenter. Sport Science is a spinoff of its predecessor Fight Science on National Geographic.
Season 1 of Sport Science is currently available for streaming from TVNZ OnDemand.

The series is filmed inside a Los Angeles airport hangar or on location using a mobile laboratory. Each episode on series 1 focused on testing certain aspects of athletics (such as human flight and reaction time), while series 2 either poses more questions from previous episodes, or tries to re-analyze sporting moments or trials and tribulations, puts a human against animals or machines, or even checking against other sports or challenging the odds with data gathered using motion sensors and accelerometers. Professional athletes are featured prominently and are used to test the limits of the human body. In addition, host John Brenkus also participated in cases where an "average Joe" was required.

The Lead Engineer throughout the Sport Science series has been Dr. Cynthia Bir, Professor of Biomedical Engineering at Wayne State University in Detroit, Michigan.  Using methods that have been developed to understand human injury biomechanics, and developing new techniques to address the unique challenges found when studying live volunteers in high impact and high speed activities, Dr. Bir helps viewers to understand the forces (internal and external) sustained and generated by the body during high level athletic activities.

Sport Science was nominated for four Sports Emmy Awards in 2008 for Series 1, winning for Outstanding Graphic Design.  Series 2 received even more accolades in 2009, being nominated for five Emmys and receiving two awards, for Outstanding Graphic Design and also for Outstanding New Approaches in Sports Programming.

References

External links
http://www.imdb.com/title/tt1129059/, retrieved on 2009-5-27
http://television.aol.com/show/sport-science/1325011/main, retrieved on 2009-5-27
Michael, Hiestand (2007-9-27), Sports + science = Latest on TV, https://www.usatoday.com/sports/columnist/hiestand-tv/2007-09-27-sports-on-tv_N.htm, retrieved on 2009-5-27

American sports television series
ESPN original programming
Fox Sports Networks original programming
2000s American documentary television series
2007 American television series debuts
2009 American television series endings